Taavi Veskimägi (born 20 November 1974) is a former Estonian state official and politician and the managing director of the Estonian electric power transmission system operator Elering.

He is a former Minister of Finance (2003–2005) and one of the two former co-Chairmen of the Union of Pro Patria and Res Publica (2006–2007).

Early life and education
Taavi Veskimägi was born in the small borough of Eidapere in Rapla County. Following graduation from secondary school 1993 in Rapla, Veskimägi continued his studies in Tallinn University of Technology, but switched in 1994 to Pedagogical University of Tallinn, majoring in public administration. He graduated in 1998 as a BA in public administration. He completed postgraduate education at Reading University in energy management and an MBA at Aalto University in business administration.

Work and party career 

Taavi Veskimägi is the Chairman of the Board of the Estonian electricity and gas transmission system operator Elering since the company’s set-up as an independent TSO in 2009. Under his leadership Elering acquired a gas transmission network, becoming a joint electricity and gas system operator in early 2016.

Previously, Taavi Veskimägi worked as an official at the Ministry of Finance, where he served as the head of the public administration department and as a ministerial advisor.

In 2001, Taavi Veskimägi joined the Estonian political party, Res Publica. At first it was a socio-political organisation, becoming a political party only on 8 December 2001. From 2001 to 2002 he served as a Treasurer of the party and was elected a Chairman in 2005 after the resignation of the former Chairman and Prime Minister of Estonia, Juhan Parts. During his time in politics, he was a member of two Estonian Parliaments, serving as leader of the parliamentary group and as Vice-President of Parliament.

As the Chairman of the Res Publica he faced the difficult task to restore the reputation of his party that was lost during the last 2 years in government or to lead the party into merger with another right-wing party. Local elections on 16 October 2005 showed a declining support for Res Publica. The party lost 13 of its 17 seats in Tallinn City Council and was forced into opposition in the capital. In April 2006 plans were unveiled for merging Res Publica with Pro Patria Union. The annual congresses voted in favour of the merger on 4 June 2006. The new party was named Union of Pro Patria and Res Publica and was led by two chairmen – Tõnis Lukas and Taavi Veskimägi. At the congress that took place on 26 May 2007 Mart Laar was elected a new chairman of the party and Taavi Veskimägi continued to serve in capacity of a member of the party board.

From 2003 until 2005 Taavi Veskimägi was the Minister of Finance of the Republic of Estonia. In 2003 Taavi Veskimägi became a member of the Estonian Parliament and leader of the Res Publica parliamentary group before he was appointed Estonian Minister of Finance. He held the position of Vice President of the Parliament from 2005 to 2006 and worked both in the parliamentary financial committee and parliamentary committee of European Union affairs. Until 2007 he was the co-chairman of the Pro Patria and Res Publica Union, the main centre-right political party in Estonia.

Civic engagement 
In 2017-2019 and 2011-2013 Taavi Veskimägi was a member of the board of the European Network of Transmission System Operators for Electricity (ENTSO-E). He has been Supervisory Board member in many state owned companies (Estonian Post Ltd., Port of Tallinn etc) and private owned companies (Olympic Entertainment Group AS, Milrem AS etc). Taavi Veskimägi is also the founder and the Chairman of the Board of the Estonian Defence Industry Association and the member of the board of the Estonian Employers’ Confederation.

Personal life
In 2002, Veskimägi married Kaja Kallas, an Estonian politician who went on to serve as prime minister of Estonia. They divorced in 2014, and have one son.

Honours 
 2017: Order of the White Star, Fourth Class
 2017: “Mente et manu” service medal, Tallinn University of Technology
 2017: “Metsis,” the highest honour awarded by the Estonian Hunters’ Society

References

External links
 Taavi Veskimägi's blog
 Elering homepage

1974 births
Living people
People from Kehtna Parish
Res Publica Party politicians
Isamaa politicians
Finance ministers of Estonia
Government ministers of Estonia
Members of the Riigikogu, 2003–2007
Members of the Riigikogu, 2007–2011
21st-century Estonian politicians
Tallinn University of Technology alumni
Tallinn University alumni
Recipients of the Order of the White Star, 4th Class